Andriy Petrovych Fartushnyak (born 24 March 1989) is a Ukrainian retired professional footballer who played as a defender.

Club career

Early years
Fartushnyak is the product of the Vidradnyi Kyiv and Dynamo Kyiv youth system.

International career

Ukraine U21
Spotted by Pavlo Yakovenko, Fartushnyak was called up to the Ukraine national under-21 football team.

External links
 
 

1989 births
Living people
Footballers from Kyiv
Ukrainian footballers
Ukraine youth international footballers
Ukraine under-21 international footballers
FC Dynamo Kyiv players
FC Dynamo-2 Kyiv players
FC Dynamo-3 Kyiv players
FC Kharkiv players
FC Obolon-Brovar Kyiv players
FC Sevastopol players
FC Tytan Armyansk players
Ukrainian expatriate footballers
Expatriate footballers in Moldova
Ukrainian expatriate sportspeople in Moldova
FC Tiraspol players
Association football defenders
Ukrainian Premier League players
Ukrainian First League players
Ukrainian Second League players